Kallingarayan was a thirteenth-century Kongu Nadu chieftain.

History 
Kalingarayan was born as a Lingaya Gounder in the Kongu Vellalar Gounder community in the western part of Tamil Nadu in 1240 CE. He independently ruled the Kongu Nadu region until it came under the influence of the Pandyan kings. When the Pandyan kings expanded their territory, Kongu Nadu was also annexed. On behalf of his elder brother Pandyan King Jatavarman Vira Pandyan II appointed Lingaya Gounder granted him the title Kalingarayan.

Achievements 
He constructed the 56.5 mile Kalingarayan Canal to connect Bhavani river with Noyyal river to enhance irrigation facilities of Erode Region. It was completed in 1283 CE. It continues to irrigate around 15,750 acres.

Legacy 
Tamil Nadu Chief minister Edappadi K. Palaniswami inaugurated the statue of Kongu Nadu chieftain Kalingarayan to honour his contributions.

Every year, 5th day of Thai month is celebrated as Kalingarayar day commemorating his works.

References

Indian royalty
1240 births
People from Tamil Nadu
Year of death unknown